Hochneukirchen-Gschaidt is an Austrian market town in the district of Wiener Neustadt-Land.  The municipality was formed by merging the former municipalities of Hochneukirchen and Gschaidt.

References

Cities and towns in Wiener Neustadt-Land District
Bucklige Welt